The first annual Urban Music Awards were presented by Jazzy Jeff and Kurtis Blow Sydney's Homebush State Sports Centre on Friday 21 July 2007. Big winners of the night included Savage and Jade McRae.

Performers
Aaradhna
Boo-Yaa Tribe
DJ Nino Brown
Israel
Kid Confucius
Fast Crew
N’Fa
Deni Hines
Jade MacRae
Mareko
Guy Sebastian
Savage 
Paulini
Phrase
Yukmouth

Nominees and Winners
Winners in Bold

Best R&B Single
Jade MacRae – Superstar 
Guy Sebastian – Oh Oh
Israel – Work Da Middle 
Savage – Moonshine

Best Hip Hop Single
Fast Crew – I Got
Scribe and P-Money – Stop the Music
Bliss n Eso – Up Jumped The Boogie/Party at My Place
Hilltop Hoods – Clown Prince

Best R&B Album
Israel – Chapter One
Jade MacRae - Jade MacRae
Vassy – My Affection
Ricki Lee – Ricki Lee

Best Hip Hop Album
Figgkidd – This Is Figgkidd
Savage - Moonshine
Bliss n Eso – Day of the Dog
Fast Crew – Set The Record Straight

Best Male Artist
Scribe 
Guy Sebastian
Figgkidd
Savage

Best Female Artist
Aaradhna 
Jade MacRae
Paulini
Maya Jupiter

Best R&B Group
Adeaze
Random
Shakaya
Brown Sugar

Best Hip Hop Group
Bliss n Eso
Hilltop Hoods
Fast Crew
Deceptikonz

Best New Talent
FiggKidd
Savage 
Jade MacRae
Fast Crew

Best DJ (Australia)
Peter Gunz 
Nino Brown
Eko
DJ Tikelz
Priority One Djs.com

Best DJ (New Zealand)
P-Money 
DJ Sir-Vere
DJ Logical 
DJ CXL

Best Video Clip
Guy Sebastian – Oh Oh
Israel – Work Da Middle
Hilltop Hoods – Clown Prince
Bliss n Eso – Up Jumped The Boogie/Party at My Place

Best Radio Show
Trail Blazin – Nino Brown - 96.1FM 
K Sera and the Dirty Dozen – 96.1FM 
Lowie's Hot 30 Countdown - 104.1FM 
Black Label Show – 93.7FM

Best Club Night (Aus)
Fat @ Gas
Candy Shop
Soul Clap 
Red Room

Best Club Night (New Zealand)
Chocolate City 
Reprezent 
Fu Bar 
RnB Superclub

Best International Act
Kanye West
Snoop Dogg
Destiny's Child
Chris Brown

References

External links
UMA '06 Page

2006 in Australian music
2006 music awards
New Zealand music awards
Australian music awards
2006 in New Zealand music